The 2016 America East Conference baseball tournament was held from May 25 through 28, 2016. All six eligible participants out of the league's seven teams met in the double-elimination tournament to be held at Edward A. LeLacheur Park in Lowell, Massachusetts, the home park of UMass Lowell. Binghamton won the championship and received the conference's automatic bid to the 2016 NCAA Division I baseball tournament.

Seeding and format
All six eligible teams were seeded one through six based on conference winning percentage only. The No. 1 and No. 2 seeds received a first-round bye. The teams then played a double-elimination tournament.  UMass Lowell, despite hosting the event, was not eligible to participate as it was transitioning from Division II.  The River Hawks are expected to complete this transition and be eligible for championships in the 2017–18 academic year.

Bracket

Schedule
All games were broadcast on AmericaEast.tv. Attendance is unknown.

*Game times in EDT. # – Rankings denote tournament seed.

References

America East Conference Baseball Tournament
Tournament
American East Conference baseball tournament
America East Conference baseball tournament
Baseball competitions in Lowell, Massachusetts
College baseball tournaments in Massachusetts